Pernille Pirchert (born ) is a Danish wheelchair curler.

Teams

References

External links 

Living people
1955 births
Danish female curlers
Danish wheelchair curlers
21st-century Danish women